King's College Guildford is an academy comprising a secondary school in Guildford, Surrey, England. It has around 500 pupils.

History 
The institution was built and opened by Surrey County Council as Park Barn School in the late 1950s. In 1991, the school was renamed King's Manor School to reflect the medieval until 16th century land ownership of this part of Guildford.

The year 2000 saw King's Manor School renamed King's College, Guildford under a 10-year management contract with a privately owned company, 3E's Enterprises. To improve performance, many teachers were changed and the school was refurbished.

The college established a sixth form in 2009, first rated in the 2011 Ofsted report: Good above the overall rating of the school in the same report: Satisfactory.

At the end of April 2012, Mrs Tracy Ward resigned as Principal after slightly more than three years after a protracted absence.

In September 2012, Kate Carriett became Principal and in October of the same year Ofsted reported overall that the school Required Improvement, finding leadership and management in the second-highest of its four simple categorisations, Good.

In September 2014, King's College became a sponsor-led academy under the governorship of the Guildford Education Partnership.

In September 2016, the Guildford Education Partnership appointed Alastair McKenzie as Principal. As of 2023, he is also the head of Fullbrook School.

In December 2016, Ofsted rated King's College as Inadequate. In a reinspection in July 2018, the college was found to be "good".

House system 
In 2005 4 house groups were created, these were: Green: Russell, Yellow: Newton, Blue: Austen, and Red: Franklin. When the school was originally opened (as Park Barn), the Houses were named after the royal palaces; in the same order: Balmoral, Windsor, Buckingham and Sandringham.

Prior to 2022, the system was: Red: Phoenix, Blue: Orion and Purple: Hercules.

As of 2022, the current house system, with 4 house groups, is: Crown, Orb, Mantle and Sceptre.

References 

Secondary schools in Surrey
Academies in Surrey
Schools in Guildford